The Charles Marsh House was a historic house at 248 President's Lane in Quincy, Massachusetts.  The -story wood-frame house was built in the 1860s, and was described as one of the city's finest examples of Italianate styling.  It has been demolished around 2009.

Its setting was described as a "Spacious lot adjoining Robert Burns park but close to commercial Granite Street...."

The house was (and remains) listed on the National Register of Historic Places in 1989.

See also
National Register of Historic Places listings in Quincy, Massachusetts

References

Houses in Quincy, Massachusetts
National Register of Historic Places in Quincy, Massachusetts
Houses on the National Register of Historic Places in Norfolk County, Massachusetts
Italianate architecture in Massachusetts